This article is about the particular significance of the year 1898 to Wales and its people.

Incumbents

Archdruid of the National Eisteddfod of Wales – Hwfa Môn

Lord Lieutenant of Anglesey – Sir Richard Henry Williams-Bulkeley, 12th Baronet  
Lord Lieutenant of Brecknockshire – Joseph Bailey, 1st Baron Glanusk
Lord Lieutenant of Caernarvonshire – John Ernest Greaves
Lord Lieutenant of Cardiganshire – Herbert Davies-Evans
Lord Lieutenant of Carmarthenshire – John Campbell, 2nd Earl Cawdor (until 29 March); Sir James Williams-Drummond, 4th Baronet (from 12 July)
Lord Lieutenant of Denbighshire – William Cornwallis-West    
Lord Lieutenant of Flintshire – Hugh Robert Hughes 
Lord Lieutenant of Glamorgan – Robert Windsor-Clive, 1st Earl of Plymouth
Lord Lieutenant of Merionethshire – W. R. M. Wynne 
Lord Lieutenant of Monmouthshire – Henry Somerset, 8th Duke of Beaufort
Lord Lieutenant of Montgomeryshire – Sir Herbert Williams-Wynn, 7th Baronet 
Lord Lieutenant of Pembrokeshire – Frederick Campbell, 3rd Earl Cawdor
Lord Lieutenant of Radnorshire – Powlett Milbank

Bishop of Bangor – Daniel Lewis Lloyd 
Bishop of Llandaff – Richard Lewis
Bishop of St Asaph – A. G. Edwards (later Archbishop of Wales) 
Bishop of St Davids – John Owen

Events
22 January — Newspaper Llais Llafur ("Labour Voice") is launched in Ystalyfera, and will continue to be published (under various titles) until 1971.
1 April–1 September — Welsh coal strike fails to remove the sliding scale, linking wages to the price of coal.
28 March–15 August — Plynlimon and Hafan Tramway runs regular market day passenger services.
10 May — Mumbles Pier is opened and the Swansea and Mumbles Railway is extended to it.
2 August — The Llandudno Motor Touring Co begins running excursions with the first motor buses in Wales at Llandudno.
24 October — The South Wales Miners' Federation is founded.
6 December — The Abercynon to Merthyr Tydfil stretch of the Glamorganshire Canal is closed because of subsidence.
date unknown
Peak year of slate production in Wales.
Opening of new docks at Barry and Port Talbot.
Opening of Lluest-wen Reservoir.
The last stained glass window to be designed by Edward Burne-Jones is installed at St Deiniol's Church, Hawarden, by Morris & Co.

Arts and literature

Awards
National Eisteddfod of Wales — held at Blaenau Ffestiniog
Chair — Robert Owen Hughes, "Awen"
Crown — Richard Roberts, "Charles o'r Bala"

New books

Welsh language
Beriah Gwynfe Evans — Dafydd Dafis
Daniel James (Gwyrosydd) — Aeron Awen Gwyrosydd
John Owen Jones (Ap Ffarmwr) — Cofiant Gladstone
T. Gwynn Jones — Gwedi Brad a Gofid

Music
none known

Sport
Football — The Welsh Cup is won by the "Druids" for the sixth time in its 20-year history
Rugby union
Senghenydd RFC and Ynysybwl RFC are founded.
February — The Welsh Rugby Union is readmitted into the International Football Rugby Board after the events of The Gould Affair and Wales can again play international rugby.
19 March — Wales defeat Ireland 11–3 in a game played at Thomond Park, Limerick

Births
10 February – Thomas Jones, Baron Maelor, politician (died 1984)
20 April – Cliff Williams, Wales international rugby union player (died 1930)
29 July – Dorothy Rees, politician (died 1987)
29 August – Sydney Hinam, Wales international rugby union player (died 1982)
24 September – Henry Arthur Evans, politician (died 1958)
6 October – William John Edwards, Cerdd Dant singer (died 1978)
25 December – Islwyn Evans, Wales international rugby player (died 1974)

Deaths
29 March – John Campbell, 2nd Earl Cawdor, politician, 80
25 May – Theophilus Harris Davies, sugar magnate, 64 
17 June – Sir Edward Burne-Jones, artist, 64
17 July – Arthur Guest, politician, 56
11 August – Owen Humphrey Davies (Eos Llechid), composer, 59 
6 September – Robert Jones, VC recipient, 41 (suicide)
26 September – Joseph Jenkins, farmer and diarist ("The Welsh Swagman"), 80
28 September – Thomas Gee, publisher, 83
29 October – David Stephen Davies, preacher and colonial leader
31 October – William Gilbert Rees, surveyor and explorer, New Zealand settler, 71
2 December – Michael D. Jones, Tad y Wladfa, founder of the Welsh settlement in Patagonia, 76
17 December – William Norton, Wales international rugby player, 36
date unknown – John Jones, astronomer, about 80

References

Wales
 Wales